Progressive jazz is a style of jazz associated with Stan Kenton. It may also refer to:

 Bebop in an evolved form
 Cool jazz, a style of American music developed during the 1940s
 Third stream, a synthesis of jazz and classical music developed during the 1950s
 Jazz fusion, a synthesis of jazz and other styles developed during the 1960s